The metatarsophalangeal joints (MTP joints), also informally known as toe knuckles, are the joints between the metatarsal bones of the foot and the proximal bones (proximal phalanges) of the toes. They are  condyloid joints, meaning that an elliptical or rounded surface (of the metatarsal bones) comes close to a shallow cavity (of the proximal phalanges).

The ligaments are the plantar and two collateral.

Movements

The movements permitted in the metatarsophalangeal joints are flexion, extension, abduction, adduction and circumduction.

See also
 Bunion
 Hallux rigidus (stiff big toe)
 Metatarsophalangeal joint sprain (turf toe)

References

External links
 Diagram at webmd.com

Joints